Zero Hour is a live album by the Avengers. It was released on vinyl in 2003 on the Italian label DBK Works. The album features a recording of a concert that took place at the Old Waldorf, San Francisco, CA on June 13, 1979, one of the band's final concerts. The same concert was released a year later on the compilation album The American in Me.

Track listing

Side One 
 "Cheap Tragedies" – 3:30
 "Zero Hour" – 3:23
 "Corpus Christi" – 3:04
 "Release Me" – 4:33

Side Two 
 "Uh-Oh" – 3:23
 "Misery (Finger On The Trigger)" – 3:05
 "Time To Die" – 5:05
 "The American In Me" – 2:10

Personnel
Penelope Houston – vocals
Brad Kent – guitar
Danny Furious – drums
Jimmy Wilsey – bass

Avengers (band) albums
2003 live albums